Gevin or Geveyn or Guyin may refer to:
 Gevin, Bashagard, Hormozgan Province
 Gevin, Khamir, Hormozgan Province
 Guyin, Kerman
Webb, Paul